Min Uti (–1451) was sawbwa of Mohnyin for a few months in 1450–1451. A grandson of King Mohnyin Thado, Uti, apparently with Chinese support, took control of Mohnyin after the sudden death of his father Thihapate of Mohnyin, and revolted against his maternal uncle King Narapati I of Ava. But his rebellion was quickly defeated, and he was executed in 1451.

Brief
Min Uti was the eldest child of Gov. Thihapate of Pyinzi and Princess Shin Hla Myat. His personal name and titles are not known. (Min Uti appears to be an epithet, signifying his later allegiance to the Chinese.) He later moved to Mohnyin after his father was transferred to the northern state in 1439. But in 1442, his father sent Uti to the court of the new king Narapati as token of loyalty. He apparently returned to Mohnyin during the Chinese incursions in the 1440s, as he was in Mohnyin at the time of his father's death in 1450/51. He and the co-sawbwas of Mogaung—Tho Kyein Bwa and Tho Bok Bwa—revolted against Ava, apparently with Chinese support. 

Their rebellion was short-lived. His uncle King Narapati I of Ava responded forcefully. The king and the Crown Prince came up with two armies (19,000 troops, 800 cavalry, 40 elephants), and put down the rebellion in 1451. Uti and the two other sawbwas were caught. The king summarily ordered the execution of his eldest nephew. The two sawbwas however won a reprieve after pleading that they partook in the rebellion only because Uti had taken the families of the sawbwas hostage. The plea worked. The king appointed Tho Bok Bwa as sawbwa of Mohnyin, and kept Tho Kyein Bwa at Mogaung.

Ancestry

Notes

Bibliography
 
 
 
 

Ava dynasty
1420s births
1451 deaths